Haluk Yıldırım (born June 25, 1972, in Bursa, Turkey) is a retired Turkish professional basketball player. He is currently the general manager of Beşiktaş men's basketball team.

Honors
 3 times Turkish Championship
 1 times Turkish Cup
 4 times President's Cup

International career
Haluk Yıldırım is a former Turkish national team player.

Personal
In 2004, he was diagnosed with Hodgkin's lymphoma, but he successfully managed to recover from it. He graduated from Anatolian Lyceé of Adana.

External links

TBLStat.net Profile
TurkSports.Net Profile 

1972 births
Living people
Beşiktaş men's basketball players
Galatasaray S.K. (men's basketball) players
Small forwards
Turkish men's basketball players
Türk Telekom B.K. players
Ülker G.S.K. basketball players
2002 FIBA World Championship players